St. George's Syrian Catholic Church is a former church located at 103 Washington Street between Rector Street and Carlisle Street in the Financial District of Manhattan, New York City. The church is the last physical reminder of the Syrian American and Lebanese American community that once lived in Little Syria.

History
Originally three stories tall with a peaked roof, the structure was built c.1812, and by 1850 was being used as a boardinghouse for immigrants; an additional two stories were added on in 1869. In 1925, the building was purchased by George E. Bardwil, a textiles importer, for the use of the Syrian Greek Catholic church, organized in 1889 to serve the Syrian- and Lebanese-American community in the Little Syria neighborhood, also known as the Syrian Quarter. Four years later, Harvey F. Cassab, a Lebanese-American draftsman, was hired to create a new facade for the building. His neo-Gothic design in white terra cotta with a polychrome relief of St. George and the Dragon remains intact.

After World War II, the Syrian and Lebanese population in the area declined, in part because the community was destroyed to make way for the Brooklyn–Battery Tunnel ramps. The Eastern Mediterranean community later moved to Atlantic Avenue in Brooklyn. The church briefly became a Roman Rite church, and then became disused as a church. In 1982 the building was bought by Moran Inc. and was turned into an Irish pub. The pub has now closed, however the building is still owned and maintained by Moran Inc.

The New York City Landmarks Preservation Commission designated the building a New York City landmark on July 14, 2009.

Marc Beherec argues that this church was the inspiration for H.P. Lovecraft's The Horror at Red Hook. The building was constructed by Ryneer Suydam, a man with a name very similar to that of the story's Robert Suydam. Beherec argues that the building's conversion from Suydam's Federalist tenement to a Gothic church by a sect he (erroneously) believed to be Nestorian, which began while he was in New York inspired Lovecraft.

See also
 List of New York City Designated Landmarks in Manhattan below 14th Street

References

External links
 

Buildings and structures completed in 1812
Churches completed in 1929
Closed churches in New York City
Eastern Catholic churches in New York (state)
Eastern Catholicism in New York City
Financial District, Manhattan
Former Catholic church buildings
Lebanese-American culture in New York (state)
Melkite Greek Catholic churches in the United States
New York City Designated Landmarks in Manhattan
Syrian-American culture in New York City